Michael Shyjan (born October 29, 1969) is an American former professional tennis player.

A Massachusetts-native of Ukrainian descent, Shyjan played collegiate tennis for Harvard University before touring professionally. In 1990 he was named Sophomore of the Year, for a season which included a win over reigning NCAA singles champion Donni Leaycraft. He was a doubles All-American in 1991 and team captain for his final two seasons.

Shyjan competed on the professional tour for five years, qualifying for ATP Tour singles main draws at Mexico City in 1993 and Newport in 1997. He featured mostly in satellite tournaments and the occasional ATP Challenger event.

References

External links
 
 

1969 births
Living people
American male tennis players
Harvard Crimson men's tennis players
Tennis people from Massachusetts
American people of Ukrainian descent